The year 2006 is the 6th year in the history of World Extreme Cagefighting, a mixed martial arts promotion based in the United States. In 2006 WEC held 7 events beginning with, WEC 18: Unfinished Business.

Title fights

Events list

WEC 18: Unfinished Business

WEC 18: Unfinished Business was an event held on January 13, 2006 at the Tachi Palace in Lemoore, California, United States.

Results

WEC 19: Undisputed

WEC 19: Undisputed was an event held on March 17, 2006 at the Tachi Palace in Lemoore, California, United States.

Results

WEC 20: Cinco de Mayhem

WEC 20: Cinco de Mayhem was an event held on May 5, 2006 at the Tachi Palace in Lemoore, California, United States.

Results

WEC 21: Tapout

WEC 21: Tapout was an event held on June 15, 2006 at the San Manuel Indian Bingo and Casino in Highland, California.

Results

WEC 22: The Hitmen

WEC 22: The Hitmen was an event held on July 8, 2006 at the Tachi Palace in Lemoore, California, United States.

Results

WEC 23: Hot August Fights

WEC 23: Hot August Fights was an event held on August 17, 2006 at the Tachi Palace in Lemoore, California, United States.

Results

WEC 24: Full Force

WEC 24: Full Force was an event held on October 12, 2006 at the Tachi Palace in Lemoore, California, United States.

Results

See also 
 List of World Extreme Cagefighting champions
 List of WEC events

References

World Extreme Cagefighting events
2006 in mixed martial arts